The 2019 Chinese Taipei Open (officially known as the Yonex Chinese Taipei Open 2019 for sponsorship reasons) was a badminton tournament which took place at Taipei Arena in Taipei, Taiwan, from 3 to 8 September 2019 and had a total purse of $500,000.

Tournament
The 2019 Chinese Taipei Open was the seventeenth tournament of the 2019 BWF World Tour and was also a part of the Chinese Taipei Open championships which had been held since 1980. This tournament was organized by the Chinese Taipei Badminton Association and sanctioned by the BWF.

Venue
This international tournament was held at Taipei Arena in Taipei, Taiwan.

Point distribution
Below is the point distribution table for each phase of the tournament based on the BWF points system for the BWF World Tour Super 300 event.

Prize money
The total prize money for this tournament was US$150,000. Distribution of prize money was in accordance with BWF regulations.

Men's singles

Seeds

 Chou Tien-chen (champion)
 Ng Ka Long (first round)
 Sameer Verma (withdrew) 
 Lee Zii Jia (second round)
 Tommy Sugiarto (first round)
 Sitthikom Thammasin (withdrew) 
 Wong Wing Ki (second round)  
 Lee Cheuk Yiu (first round)

Finals

Top half

Section 1

Section 2

Bottom half

Section 3

Section 4

Women's singles

Seeds

 Saina Nehwal (withdrew) 
 Michelle Li (final)
 Zhang Beiwen (second round)  
 Sung Ji-hyun (champion)
 Gregoria Mariska Tunjung (quarter-finals)
 Busanan Ongbamrungphan (withdrew)
 Nitchaon Jindapol (quarter-finals)
 Kirsty Gilmour (first round)

Finals

Top half

Section 1

Section 2

Bottom half

Section 3

Section 4

Men's doubles

Seeds

 Fajar Alfian / Muhammad Rian Ardianto (quarter-finals)
 Lee Yang / Wang Chi-lin (semi-finals)
 Aaron Chia / Soh Wooi Yik (quarter-finals)
 Goh V Shem / Tan Wee Kiong (champions)
 Liao Min-chun / Su Ching-heng (first round)
 Ko Sung-hyun / Shin Baek-cheol (first round)
 Lu Ching-yao / Yang Po-han (first round)
 Ong Yew Sin / Teo Ee Yi (withdrew)

Finals

Top half

Section 1

Section 2

Bottom half

Section 3

Section 4

Women's doubles

Seeds

 Greysia Polii / Apriyani Rahayu (semi-finals)
 Lee So-hee / Shin Seung-chan (quarter-finals) 
 Kim So-yeong / Kong Hee-yong (final)
 Jongkolphan Kititharakul / Rawinda Prajongjai (champions)
 Nami Matsuyama / Chiharu Shida (quarter-finals) 
 Chow Mei Kuan / Lee Meng Yean (withdrew)
 Vivian Hoo Kah Mun / Yap Cheng Wen (withdrew)
 Ayako Sakuramoto / Yukiko Takahata (quarter-finals)

Finals

Top half

Section 1

Section 2

Bottom half

Section 3

Section 4

Mixed doubles

Seeds

 Chan Peng Soon / Goh Liu Ying (semi-finals)
 Seo Seung-jae / Chae Yoo-jung (final)
 Hafiz Faizal / Gloria Emanuelle Widjaja (semi-finals)
 Tang Chun Man / Tse Ying Suet (champions)
 Nipitphon Phuangphuapet / Savitree Amitrapai (quarter-finals)
 Rinov Rivaldy / Pitha Haningtyas Mentari (quarter-finals)
 Tontowi Ahmad / Winny Oktavina Kandow (quarter-finals)
 Ko Sung-hyun / Eom Hye-won (second round)

Finals

Top half

Section 1

Section 2

Bottom half

Section 3

Section 4

References

External links
 Tournament Link
 Official Website

Chinese Taipei Open
Chinese Taipei Open (badminton)
Chinese Taipei Open (badminton)
Chinese Taipei Open (badminton)